The Chairman of the Indian Space Research Organisation is the statutory head of the Indian Space Research Organisation (ISRO). The officeholder is a secretary to the government of India and an executive of the Department of Space (DOS) which directly reports to the prime minister of India.

The Indian National Committee for Space Research (INCOSPAR) was founded in 1962 under the 
Department of Atomic Energy (DAE) with Vikram Sarabhai as its chairperson which in 1969 became ISRO. In 1972, government of India had set up a space commission and DOS and brought ISRO under DOS.

Since Sarabhai has assumed the position, there have been eleven chairmen of the ISRO, with Satish Dhawan serving the longest term of 12 years as the chairman.

List of chairmen

See also 
Homi J. Bhabha
Sriharikota

Notes and references

References

Notes

External links 
List of ISRO Chairman

Space programme of India
chairmen